Homoeographa is a genus of snout moths described by Émile Louis Ragonot in 1888.

Species
Homoeographa lanceolella
Homoeographa mexicana

References

Phycitinae
Taxa named by Émile Louis Ragonot
Pyralidae genera